Notable people known as A. H. Smith include:
A. Hyatt Smith (1814–1892), American politician
Abby Hadassah Smith (1797–1879), American suffragist
Albert Hugh Smith (1903–1967), English philologist

See also
 List of people with surname Smith